Captain Boycott is a 1947 British historical drama film directed by Frank Launder and starring Stewart Granger, Kathleen Ryan, Mervyn Johns, Alastair Sim and Cecil Parker. Robert Donat makes a cameo appearance as the Irish nationalist leader Charles Stewart Parnell. The film explains how the word boycott appeared in the English language. Ironically, the titular character plays a secondary role in the film, as an anti-hero, and the hero of the film is Hugh Davin.

Plot
In 1880 in County Mayo, during the period of Irish history known as the Land War, Irish tenant farmers agitated for reinstatement of their former lower rents and increased tenants' rights, especially from absentee English landlords. They particularly resented evictions. Some resorted to the gun to achieve justice, but others, inspired by the Irish statesman Charles Stewart Parnell (played in a brief cameo role by Robert Donat), shunned violence and adopted a form of passive resistance.

Parnell advocates the theory that potential new tenants should never bid for farms from which the old or current tenant has been evicted: this is the core of the "boycott" concept. The crowd, containing Davin and his friends, who had thought that Parnell was going to speak in favour of eviction, put their rotten eggs away and are instead impressed.

The farmers are led by Hugh Davin (Stewart Granger) who, with the moral support of the local priest, Father McKeogh (Alastair Sim), encourages his fellow tenants to ostracize their land agent, the bombastic Captain Boycott (Cecil Parker). There is a love interest in the form of Ann Killain (Kathleen Ryan), whose father is also shunned for taking up a farm from which another farmer had been evicted. The resultant stand-off attracts international news coverage and will ultimately introduce a new word – to boycott – to the English language.

Actions begin with Boycott's servants abandoning his house. One final servant, Bridget, is caught as last to leave. She tells him Davin asked them to leave. Everyone refuses to gather Boycott's crops. The situation persists and Boycott asks for the support of the British parliament. The story reaches every newspaper and becomes the subject of music hall jokes. The British press go to the Boycott estate, followed by a squad of troopers to support him.

Things start to get out of hand when the authorities, at the word of Boycott, demolish Davin's farm.

Captain Boycott risks his survival, having lost all other income, on his horse racing at the Curragh. The Captain acts as his own jockey on a horse bought from Davin. However, the crowd will not tolerate it, and despite the number of mounted troopers they block the Captain on his horse as he approaches the finishing line and mob him.

Michael Fagan steals Davin's revolver and tries to kill Killain, who has been signing the eviction notices. A fight ensues and Fagan falls in a river. It is reported that he has been murdered. Davin tries to stop the mob from lynching Killain because he loves his daughter.

Davin rushes to the Killain cottage and finds the priest giving Killain the last rites having been shot by Fagan. When the mob arrive they are pointed to Boycott and the troops leaving: their cause lost. The priest says if anything like this happens again they will be able to "boycott" him.

Cast

 Stewart Granger as Hugh Davin
 Kathleen Ryan as Anne Killain
 Cecil Parker as Capt. Charles Boycott
 Mervyn Johns as Watty Connell
 Alastair Sim as Father McKeogh the local priest
 Noel Purcell as Daniel McGinty
 Niall MacGinnis as Mark Killain
 Maureen Delany as Mrs. Davin
 Eddie Byrne as Sean Kerin
 Liam Gaffney as Michael Fagan
 Liam Redmond as Martin Egan
 Edward Lexy as Sgt. Dempsey
 Robert Donat as Charles Stewart Parnell
 Bernadette O'Farrell as Mrs. Fagan
 Harry Webster as Robert Hogan
 Reginald Purdell as Reporter
 Cavan Malone as Billy Killain

Production
During shooting of this film in 1946, Bernard Cardinal Griffin, the then Archbishop of Westminster, paid an official visit to the set, during which he met the film's two stars Kathleen Ryan and Stewart Granger.  The event was filmed for newsreel.

Box office
According to trade papers, the film was a "notable box office attraction" at British cinemas in 1947.

Critical reception
Overall, the reception of the movie was positive. In an original review published in 1947, The New York Times Bosley Crowther enthused that "a generous assortment of rich and pungent Irish characters contributes not only to the action but to the spirit, humor and charm of the film ... with the added virtues of beautiful vistas across the Irish countryside Launder have given us a picture which should thrill, amuse—and counsel well." Screenonline described Captain Boycott as "expertly constructed, wittily scripted, impeccably cast and enormously entertaining". Film 4 reviews, while describing the movie as "by turns enlightening and inspiring" felt that it had missed the point somewhat, and that "its characters are a little too quaint and good to convince ... while the script remains curiously unfocused."

References

External links 
 

 Review of film at Variety

1947 films
Films directed by Frank Launder
Films set in the 1880s
Films shot at Pinewood Studios
Films scored by William Alwyn
British historical drama films
1940s historical drama films
1947 drama films
1940s English-language films
1940s British films